Islamic Jerusalem Studies is a field of Study offered by several academic colleges and universities that focuses on the region of the Holy Land from an Islamic perspective.  It embraces both Islamic Studies and theology as well as history, geography, archeology, and architecture.

The field

Islamic Jerusalem Studies is a relatively new field of academic inquiry concerned with the region known in Arabic as Bayt Al-Maqdis. Since its establishment in London in 1994, the founder of the field Professor Abd al-Fattah El-Awaisi, has encouraged promising academics to contribute to this  endeavor by adopting and promoting a multidisciplinary and interdisciplinary approach to the study of the region. The term Islamicjerusalem has three main elements: the land, its population, and a unique vision of inclusivity for the two.

Institutionalisation and development

The field dates to the creation of ISRA (Academy for Islamic Jerusalem Studies) in 1994 in the United Kingdom. The academy helped institutionalise the field in British higher education. The founder first taught a module at Undergraduate level entitled ‘Islamic Jerusalem’ at the al-Quds University and in the 1990s at the University of Stirling. This was followed by PhD candidates researching the field at Edinburgh, Strathclyde and Glasgow Caledonian Universities.

The majority of the research emerged with the launch of the first institution dedicated specifically to the field of Islamic Jerusalem Studies, Al-Maktoum Institute in Dundee in 2001. The institute supports original postgraduate research. It offers Masters and PhD programs in Islamic Jerusalem Studies accredited by the University of Aberdeen.

Ten years later field started to expand beyond the United Kingdom, in particular within the Arab and Muslim World. Currently courses are offered in at universities in Egypt, Palestine and Malaysia.

The Annual International Conference

The first Annual International Conference took place in 1997. The 13 (as of 2010) Annual International conferences attracted distinguished scholars from around the world. The last conference took place at SOAS University of London in November 2010 and was entitled ‘Orientalist approaches to Islamic Jerusalem'.

Publications

The Journal of Islamicjerusalem Studies

The lack of available academic literature led to the establishment of the first issue of Journal of Islamic Jerusalem Studies in the winter of 1997. The Journal brings together findings from archaeological, theological, historical and geographical studies and is published in Arabic and English.

Islamicjerusalem Studies Series

ISRA acknowledges the most innovative and creative research within the field through initiatives such as the Islamic Jerusalem Prize for Young Scholars and the Al-Maqdisi Award.

Books include:

 نظرية جديدة لتفسير التصميم والتخطيط الهندسي لقبة الصخرة والفكر التخطيطي الهندسي الإسلامي في الفترة الإسلامية المبكرة.  هيثم فتحي الرطروط
 The First Islamic Conquest of Aelia (Islamic Jerusalem): A Critical Analytical Study of the Early Islamic Historical Narrations and Sources. Othman Ismael al-Tel
 Islamic Research Academy: 1994 – 2004 Background, Activities and Achievements, With Special Reference to the New Field of Inquiry of Islamicjerusalem Studies.  Aisha Al-Ahlas
 The Architectural Development of Al-Aqsa Mosque in Islamic Jerusalem in the Early Islamic Period: Sacred Architecture in the Shape of the ‘Holy’.  Haithem Fathi Al-Ratrout
 Introducing Islamic Jerusalem. Abd al-Fattah M. El-Awaisi
 Mapping Islamic Jerusalem: A Rediscovery of Geographical Boundaries.  Khalid El-Awaisi
 Islamic Jerusalem and its Christians: A History of Tolerance and Tensions.  I B Tauris & Co Ltd (2007).  Maher Abu-Munshar
 Islamic Jerusalem Studies: A Guide. ALMI Press 2007.  Abd al-Fattah El-Awaisi
	البعد الأكاديمي والمعرفي لبيت المقدس: التعريف بأركان الحقل المعرفي الجديد في العالم العربي ( مجمع البحوث الإسلامية ومركز البحوث الاجتماعية والانسانية بجامعة العلوم والتكنولوجيا ( 2008تحرير: عبد الفتاح محمد العويسي
 Geographical Dimensions of Islamic Jerusalem.  Cambridge Scholars Publishing (2008)  Khalid El-Awaisi (Editor)

Further reading
Al-Tel, Othman. The first Islamic conquest of Aelia. Islamicjerusalem) A Critical Analytical Study of the Early Islamic Historical Narratives and Sources. ALMI Press. (2003)
El-Awaisi,  Abd al-Fattah. Umar's Assurance of Safety to the People of Aelia (Jerusalem): A critical Analytical Study of the Historical Sources. Journal of Islamic Jerusalem Studies. Vol. 3, No 2 (Summer 2000) pp 47–49.
Al-Ratrout, Haithem. The Architectural Development Of Al-Aqsa Mosque in The Early Islamic Period Sacred Architecture in the shape of the ‘Holy’
Al-Ahlas, Aisha. Islamic Research Academy 1994-2994 Background, Activities and Achievements, with special reference to the New field of Inquiry Islamic Jerusalem Studies. (2004)
El-Awaisi, Khalid, Mapping Islamic Jerusalem, A Rediscovery of Geographical Boundaries. ALMI Press (2007)

References

External links
 isra.org.uk
 abdn.ac.uk

History of Palestine (region)
Historiography of Israel